Otley bus station serves the town of Otley, West Yorkshire, England.

The bus station consists of five stands in total. Stands 1 to 4 are in the bus station, whereas stand 5 is on Crossgate just next to the Bus Station. Unlike most of the bus stations in West Yorkshire, Otley Bus Station is privately owned by the Miller Group who own the Orchard Gate centre. As Otley currently does not have a railway station there is a regular connection from the town to Menston railway station 2 miles (3 km) away. This links the town with the Wharfedale Line to Leeds and Bradford.

Services
The following services serve Otley Bus Station:

References

External links

 Metro's Otley Bus Station page
 Otley bus users miss out on safety cash - Craven Herald

Bus stations in West Yorkshire
Otley